Fenix–Deceuninck is a women's professional road bicycle racing team based in Belgium, that was formed in 2020.

History
In May 2020,  announced the launch of a Women's road team, aimed at providing racing opportunities for their cyclocross stars all year round.

The following March, following sponsorship from German haircare company Dr. Wolff and its Plantur caffeine shampoo brand, and Dutch architectural materials provider Pura NFC by Trespa, the team became known as Plantur–Pura.

Team roster

Major results
2021
Baal Cyclo-cross, Ceylin Alvarado
Hamme-Zogge Cyclo-cross, Ceylin Alvarado
Overijse Cyclo-cross, Ceylin Alvarado
Lille Cyclo-cross, Ceylin Alvarado
Brussels, Cyclo-cross, Ceylin Alvarado
UCI Ranking Cyclo-cross, Ceylin Alvarado
 Vlaams-Brabant Provincial Time Trial Championships, Kiona Crabbé
Nederhasselt, Julie De Wilde
Beringen Cyclo-cross, Yara Kastelijn
Meulebeke Cyclo-cross, Sanne Cant
Iowa City Cyclo-cross, Manon Bakker

World, Continental & National champions
2021
 Belgium Cyclo-cross,Sanne Cant
 European Track (Team pursuit), Laura Süßemilch
 World Track (Team pursuit), Laura Süßemilch

2022
 Austria Time Trial, Christina Schweinberger
 Belgium Road, Kim De Baat

References

External links

UCI Women's Teams
Cycling teams based in Belgium
Cycling teams established in 2020
2020 establishments in Belgium